Petrophila aengusalis is a moth in the family Crambidae. It was described by William Schaus in 1924. Its type locality is Rio de Janeiro. The species was transferred from Argyractis to Petrophila in 1995.

References

Petrophila
Moths described in 1924
Taxa named by William Schaus
Moths of South America